Ventas is a station on Line 2 and Line 5 of the Madrid Metro. It is located in fare Zone A.

The station gives service to Plaza de Toros de Las Ventas, Madrid's main bullfighting ring.

References 

Line 2 (Madrid Metro) stations
Line 5 (Madrid Metro) stations
Railway stations in Spain opened in 1924